The 2005 Grand National (officially known as the John Smith's Grand National for sponsorship reasons) was the 158th official annual running of the Grand National steeplechase which took place at Aintree Racecourse near Liverpool, England, on 9 April 2005 and attracted the maximum permitted field of 40 competitors for total prize money of £700,000 including £406,000 to the winner.

The nine-year-old 7/1 favourite Hedgehunter, ridden by Ruby Walsh and trained by Willie Mullins, won the race by 14 lengths, in a time of 9 minutes 21 seconds. 40/1 shot Royal Auclair finished second, from 66/1-rated Simply Gifted in third.

The start of the race was moved back 25 minutes to avoid clashing with the wedding of Prince Charles and Camilla Parker Bowles. Over half of the field completed the course and all the horses returned safely, although Frenchman's Creek was retired afterward. There was much media interest in Carrie Ford, the rider of Forest Gunner, who was considered the first genuine opportunity a woman had to win a Grand National. The pairing was sent off as second-favourite and finished fifth.

The showpiece race was seen by the largest attendance at Aintree since the Monday National of 1997, with a crowd of 70,850 people, and a total of 151,660 over the course of the three-day meeting.

Racecard

Finishing order

Media coverage & course modifications

The race was covered live by the BBC on television and radio in the United Kingdom in accordance with the Ofcom Code on Sports and Other Listed and Designated Events which recognises the Grand National as a sporting event of significant public interest.

The television coverage was presented by Sue Barker and Clare Balding and was part of a Grandstand special for the 46th consecutive year. Race commentary was provided by a four-man team consisting of Ian Bartlett, Tony O'Hehir, Darren Owen, and lead commentator Jim McGrath who called the runners home for the eighth year.

Becher's Brook was modified slightly after a mini pile-up in the 2004 renewal. Running water was back at the fence for the first time since 1989 which was covered over by rubber matting.

Jockeys
Carl Llewellyn had been the senior rider in the weighing room since the retirement of Richard Dunwoody after the 1999 race and became only the ninth rider ever to weigh out for a 15th National, having previously won the race in 1992 and 1998.

Nine riders made their Grand National debut, with Christian Williams finishing second and Carrie Ford fifth, while Tom Malone, David Dunsdon, Peter Buchanon and Robbie Power also completed the course. However, Alan Crowe's first ride ended at the second fence while Paddy Brennan and Tom Greenall also failed to reach the finishing post.

References
Notes

Sources
Replay: Watch the 2005 Grand National BBC Sport

Grand National
 2005
Grand National
21st century in Merseyside
Grand
April 2005 sports events in the United Kingdom